Chuck Harrison may refer to:

 Charles "Chuck" Harrison (1931–2018), American industrial designer
 Chuck Harrison (baseball) (born 1941), retired American baseball player